DTH may refer to:
 The Daily Tar Heel, University of North Carolina student newspaper
 Dance Theatre of Harlem, New York City
 Danmarks Tekniske Højskole, a previous name for the Technical University of Denmark
 Death Valley Airport, IATA code
 Dekatherm, Dth,  10 therms: unit of heat
 Delayed type hypersensitivity, an immune system response
 Demokratik Toplum Hareketi, the Turkish name for the Democratic Society Movement
 Direct-to-home television
 Doctor of Theology, DTh or Th.D. degree
 Down-the-hole drill